Elizabeth Ivy Douglas-Hamilton, Duchess of Hamilton, OBE, DL (25 May 1916 – 16 September 2008), was the daughter of Alan Percy, 8th Duke of Northumberland (1880–1930) and his wife, Helen.

She was born as Lady Elizabeth Ivy Percy at Alnwick Castle in Northumberland and spent her youth between there, Albury House in Surrey and Syon House in Middlesex. She was married in 1937 to Douglas Douglas-Hamilton (the then Marquess of Douglas and Clydesdale), who subsequently became the 14th Duke of Hamilton and 11th Duke of Brandon.

References

1916 births
2008 deaths
British duchesses by marriage
Daughters of British dukes
Officers of the Order of the British Empire
Elizabeth Douglas-Hamilton, Duchess of Hamilton and Brandon
Deputy Lieutenants of East Lothian